Robert G. Baldwin (1914–1977) was an American cartoonist. He used the signature Rupe, and was best known for his comic strip Freddy, about a goofy kid.

Biography

Education and early career 
Baldwin studied painting at Washington's Corcoran School of Art. Instead of entering the field of fine art, however, he supported himself with government work and advertising art. His cartoon illustrations led him into minor comic book artwork, contributing to Prize Comics and Spook Comics.

Freddy

In the early 1950s, Baldwin and his wife, music teacher Helen L. Baldwin (1913–1998), were living in the Far East, where he worked for the Central Intelligence Agency, when they created the comic strip Freddy about a little boy named Freddy J. McReady. As he drew, she wrote gags for the strip, which was loosely based on their children. In 1955, he left the CIA and concentrated on the strip, using a loose brush ink style to draw his chubby child. Eventually published in 100 newspapers, it ran from 1955 to 1980, distributed by the George Matthew Adams Service and later The Washington Star Syndicate and Field Enterprises. 

In 1964, Baldwin described his working methods:

The appeal of Freddy and his friends was that they acted like real children, often hyperactive. In 1969, a curious attempt to make the character slightly older and less childlike backfired, as evident in an April 30, 1969 statement by Harry E. Elmlark of the Washington Star Syndicate:

During the 1960s, Baldwin's assistant was Howard Rands, who drew his own strip, Twitch, during the 1970s. Born in Geneva, New York, Rands studied at the Abbott Art School, was in the U. S. Merchant Marine and illustrated several Air Force magazines.

The Baldwins lived in Washington, D.C. Robert Baldwin died in 1977, and Helen Baldwin died March 14, 1998, from Lou Gehrig's disease.

Books
Ken Pierce Books did a 64-page book collection of the Freddy daily strips that ran from May to October in 1956. Dell's Freddy comic book, which ran for three issues in 1963-64, was not by Baldwin but was drawn by Bob Gustafson.

References

1977 deaths
American comic strip cartoonists
1914 births